
Facing the World is a UK-registered charity, promoting surgery for children with facial differences.  It was founded in 2002 by two surgeons, Martin Hirigoyen Kelly and Norman Waterhouse, and was originally focused on bringing children from the developing world to the UK for surgery.  

Over time it came to focus mostly on Vietnam, and on training Vietnamese doctors in the surgeries, sending UK doctors to Vietnam to perform surgeries, and providing equipment to Vietnamese hospitals; it became active in Vietnam in 2008.  It has cooperated with two hospitals in Hanoi and a hospital in Da Nang.

See also
Effects of Agent Orange on the Vietnamese people

References

Further reading

External links

2003 establishments in the United Kingdom
Children's charities based in the United Kingdom
Health in the London Borough of Hammersmith and Fulham
Oral and maxillofacial surgery organizations
Organisations based in the London Borough of Hammersmith and Fulham
Plastic surgery organizations